Måløv is a suburb  within Ballerup Municipality, closely attached to Smørumnedre approx. 20 km. west of Copenhagen, in the Capital region, with a population of 8,787 (2022). The suburb is made up by single-family houses and a housing project. 93% of the inhabitants are native Danes. The suburb is connected with the S-train and Måløv station serves commuters from both Måløv and Smørumnedre. Måløv is considered to be founded in 1193.

Green areas 
Måløv has many green areas and fields around it. So although the city today differs in both scope and character from the time Måløv was a village and a station village, the traces of the bygone times are easy to find. Måløv is thus still a rural town, and as some citizens of Måløv express it: "a lovely city to live in".

Notable people 
 Nicoline Sørensen (born 1997 in Måløv) a Danish football player who plays for Everton F.C. (women)

Villages in Denmark
Copenhagen metropolitan area
Ballerup Municipality